Michael John Papierski (born February 26, 1996) is an American professional baseball catcher and first baseman in the Detroit Tigers organization. He has also played for the San Francisco Giants and Cincinnati Reds.

Papierski played college baseball for the LSU Tigers and was selected in the ninth round in the 2017 MLB draft by the Houston Astros. He made his MLB debut in May 2022 with the Giants.

Early life and amateur career
Papierski grew up in Lemont, Illinois, and attended Lemont High School. He was selected in the 16th round of the 2014 Major League Baseball draft by the Toronto Blue Jays, but opted not to sign in favor of attending Louisiana State University (LSU).

Papierski played college baseball for the LSU Tigers for three seasons. He spent the majority of his freshman season as the backup to starting catcher Kade Scivicque. In 2015, he played collegiate summer baseball with the Yarmouth–Dennis Red Sox of the Cape Cod Baseball League. Papierski started 40 games at catcher and hit .242/.358/.387 in his sophomore season. As a junior, Papierski hit  .256/.401/.477 with 11 home runs and 39 RBIs in 65 games, and was named to the SEC All-Defensive team after throwing out 23 baserunners.

Professional career

Houston Astros
The Houston Astros selected Papierski in the ninth round of the 2017 Major League Baseball draft. After signing with the team he was assigned to the Tri-City ValleyCats of the New York–Penn League. Papierski spent the 2018 season with the Class A Quad Cities River Bandits. 

He was assigned to the Fayetteville Woodpeckers of the Class A-Advanced Carolina League in 2019, where he batted .233/.351/.324 with seven home runs, 11 doubles, one triple, and 38 RBIs. After the 2020 minor league season was canceled due to the COVID-19 pandemic, Papierski was added to the Astros' alternate training site roster for the Major League season.  He spent the 2021 season with the Triple-A Sugar Land Skeeters, hitting .246/.379/.375 with 7 home runs and 46 RBIs. He opened the 2022 season back with Sugar Land.

San Francisco Giants
On May 14, 2022, the Astros traded Papierski to the San Francisco Giants in exchange for Mauricio Dubón. He was assigned to the Sacramento River Cats. Papierski  was promoted to the Giants' major league roster on May 21, 2022. He made his debut later that day in 2-1 loss to the San Diego Padres.

Cincinnati Reds
On June 25, 2022 he was claimed off waivers from San Francisco by the Cincinnati Reds. He recorded his first major league hit on June 29, 2022 against the Chicago Cubs.

Detroit Tigers
On October 14, 2022, he was claimed off waivers by the Detroit Tigers. On November 18, he was non tendered and became a free agent. He resigned a minor league deal on November 29, 2022.

References

External links

LSU Tigers bio

1996 births
Living people
Baseball players from Illinois
People from Palos Heights, Illinois
Major League Baseball catchers
San Francisco Giants players
Cincinnati Reds players
LSU Tigers baseball players
Tri-City ValleyCats players
Quad Cities River Bandits players
Fayetteville Woodpeckers players
Sugar Land Skeeters players
Sugar Land Space Cowboys players
Sacramento River Cats players
Yarmouth–Dennis Red Sox players
Eau Claire Express players